WJBB (1300 kHz AM) with FM translator W296CX at 107.1 MHz is a radio station broadcasting Talk/Personality, high school sports, and music. The station is primarily branded by its FM translator frequency as "WJBB, 107.1". Licensed to Winder, Georgia, United States, the station is currently owned by Jeffrey Taylor Batten, through licensee Barrow Radio Broadcasting, LLC, and features community programming and sports with the various High Schools.

Sports
WJBB broadcasts Atlanta Braves baseball and Northeast Georgia prep sports.

References

External links

JBB